Radomir Nikolić (born 2 February 1976) is a Serbian politician who served as the mayor of Kragujevac from 2014 until 2020. Nikolić is the son of Tomislav Nikolić, the former president of Serbia.

Early life 
He was born in Kragujevac, Serbia. He finished primary and high school in his hometown.

Career 
Nikolić completed his education in Belgrade, where he acquired the title of manager. 

He was employed in the private and public sector, first as a salesman, then as an employee in Komercijalna Banka and Srbijagas.

He has been a member of the Serbian Progressive Party since its founding in 2008. He performed the function of the president of the Serbian Progressive Party board in Kragujevac in the period from 2010 to 2012.

In June 2012, he was elected Vice President of the Main Board of the Serbian Progressive Party, and in October of the same year, President of the Executive Board of the Serbian Progressive Party. In the local elections in 2012, he was the first on the list of the board group of the Serbian Progressive Party. 

He was elected the mayor of Kragujevac at the session of the City Assembly on October 28, 2014.

Personal life 
He is married and has three children.

See also
 City of Kragujevac
 List of mayors of Kragujevac

References 

1976 births
Living people
Mayors of Kragujevac
Serbian Progressive Party politicians